The noble family of the Waldgraves  or Wildgraves (Latin: comites silvestres) descended of a division of the House of the Counts of Nahegau in the year 1113.

They were named after the geographic properties of their territories: Wildgrave after  ("forest"), and Raugrave after the rough (i.e. mountainous) terrain.

References 

German noble families
Noble families of the Holy Roman Empire